Lada (Cyrillic: Лада) is a Slavic female given name. In Slavic mythology, Lada is the goddess of beauty, love and marriage. It may be related to the word lad (order), the Old Czech lada (girl, maid) or Serbian and Croatian mlada (bride). Pronounced lah-dah. Lada is also a shortened name for the Slavic names Ladislava and Wladysława.

Lada is also a Polish, Czech surname.

Name days 
Czech: 7 August
Slovenian: 4 May or 27 June

People

Lada
Lada Adamic – American scientist
Lada Chernova – Russian javelin thrower
Lada Dance – Russian singer and actress
Lada Engchawadechasilp – Thai American beauty pageant contestant
Lada Galina – pen name of Ganka Slavova Karanfilova, a Bulgarian writer
 – Czech actress
Lada Jiyenbalanova – Kazakhstani modern pentathlete
Lada Kaštelan – Croatian writer
Lada Kozlíková – Czech cyclist
Lada Luzina (born 1972), Ukrainian author and journalist
 – Ukrainian Russian-language writer and journalist
Lada Negrul – Russian actress and poet
Lada Nesterenko – Ukrainian cross country skier
Lada St. Edmund – American personal trainer and dancer
Lada Zadonskaya – Russian speed skater
Lada Žigo – Croatian writer

Ladislava
Ladislava Bakanic – American gymnast
 – Czech actress
 – Czech actress

Fictional characters
Princess Lada from Princezna se zlatou hvězdou

See also
Ladislav, male form of Ladislava
Ladas (disambiguation)

References

External links
Baby Names World: Lada
BabyNames.com: Lada

Feminine given names
Slavic feminine given names
Russian feminine given names
Czech feminine given names
Slovak feminine given names
Slovene feminine given names
Serbian feminine given names
Croatian feminine given names